Daniel Duranti (1633 - 1712 or 1713) was an Italian Catholic priest, mostly known for serving as Archbishop of the Roman Catholic Diocese of Skopje and Apostolic Vicar of Roman Catholic Archdiocese of Izmir.

Duranti was born in Arezzo, on 17 September 1633, and ordained priest on 8 March 1664. On 11 December 1690 he was appointed Archbishop of the Diocese of Skopje (ordained Bishop in 1691), position which had remained empty since the death of Pjetër Bogdani. He served in that position until 29 July 1702, when he resigned. Simultaneously, during 7 June 1696 - 1706, and 1708 - 1713, he served as Vicar Apostolic of the Roman Catholic Archdiocese of Izmir. He died from a plague epidemic together with circa 10,000 people in Izmir, most probably in 1712.

See also
Catholic Church in Turkey

References

18th-century Italian Roman Catholic titular archbishops
1633 births
1712 deaths
17th-century Roman Catholic archbishops in the Ottoman Empire
18th-century Roman Catholic archbishops in the Ottoman Empire
18th-century deaths from plague (disease)
People from Arezzo
Bishops of Skopje
Italian expatriate bishops